2012–13 Hong Kong Second Division League is the 67th season of Hong Kong Second Division League, a football league in Hong Kong.

Teams

Change from last season

From Second Division League
Promoted to Hong Kong First Division League
 Kam Fung
 Southern District

Relegated to Second Division League
 Kwun Tong
 Kwai Tsing

To Second Division League
Relegated from First Division League
 Hong Kong Sapling (demolished)
 Sham Shui Po

Promoted from Third Division League
 Eastern (renamed as Eastern Salon)
 Tuen Mun FC

Team review
The following 11 clubs are competing in the Hong Kong Second Division League during the 2012–13 season.

League table

Results table

Fixtures and results

Week 1

Week 2

Week 3

Week 4

Week 5

Week 6

Week 7

Week 8

Week 9

Week 10

Week 11

Week 12

Week 13

Week 14

Week 15

Week 16

Week 17

Week 18

Week 19

Week 20

Week 21

Week 22

Season statistics

Top scorers

References

Hong Kong Second Division League seasons
Hong
2012–13 in Hong Kong football leagues